In psychology, mirroring is a behaviour in which one person copies another person

Mirroring may also refer to:

 AirPlay Mirroring, an iOS 5 feature for wireless video streaming
 Disk mirroring, replicating the entire content of a storage disk
 Port mirroring, replicating network packets for diagnostic purposes

See also 
 Mirror (disambiguation)
 Mirror (computing) (disambiguation)